Moriarty is a locality and small rural community in the local government area of Latrobe, in the North West region of Tasmania. The 2016 census determined a population of 223 for the state suburb of Moriarty.

History
The locality is believed to have been named for Miss Lucinda Moriarty, a prominent early settler.

Road infrastructure
The C702 (Moriarty Road) and C704 (Oppenheims Road) routes run from the Bass Highway through the locality, from where they provide access to many other localities in northern Tasmania. The B71 route (Frankford Road), which runs from the B74 route (Bass Highway to Port Sorell) in East Devonport to Exeter on the West Tamar Highway, passes through the locality.

References

Localities of Latrobe Council
Towns in Tasmania